Amaka Gessler (born 24 April 1990) is a New Zealand representative swimmer. She won the silver medal in the 4 × 200 m freestyle relay at the 2010 Commonwealth Games alongside Lauren Boyle, Natasha Hind and Penelope Marshall. She won the bronze medal with the same team in the 4 × 100 m freestyle relay at the same Games. She also represented New Zealand at the 2012 Olympic games in the 4 × 200 m and 4 × 100 m Freestyle relay

References

External links
 
 

1990 births
Living people
New Zealand female swimmers
Olympic swimmers of New Zealand
Swimmers at the 2012 Summer Olympics
Commonwealth Games silver medallists for New Zealand
Commonwealth Games bronze medallists for New Zealand
Swimmers at the 2010 Commonwealth Games
New Zealand female freestyle swimmers
Commonwealth Games medallists in swimming
Universiade medalists in swimming
Universiade silver medalists for New Zealand
Medalists at the 2011 Summer Universiade
20th-century New Zealand women
21st-century New Zealand women
Medallists at the 2010 Commonwealth Games